Erik Henschel (born 4 October 1996) is a German footballer who plays as a right-back for SV Arminia Hannover.

Career
Henschel made his professional debut for Hallescher FC in the 3. Liga on 22 December 2018, coming on as a substitute in the 90th minute for Marvin Ajani in the 2–0 home win against FSV Zwickau.

References

External links
 Profile at DFB.de
 

1996 births
Living people
Sportspeople from Hildesheim
Footballers from Lower Saxony
German footballers
Association football fullbacks
Eintracht Braunschweig II players
Hallescher FC players
Hannoverscher SC players
TSV Havelse players
SV Arminia Hannover players
3. Liga players
Regionalliga players
Oberliga (football) players